Michael Klein may refer to:

 Michael L. Klein (born 1940), professor of chemistry at Temple University, member of the US National Academy of Sciences
 Michael Klein (businessman) (born 1951), CEO of the Casas Bahia chain of stores in Brazil
 Michael Klein (writer) (born 1954), faculty in English at Goddard College in the US
 Michael Klein (art dealer) (born 1952), former curator of the Microsoft Art Collection, Director of the International Sculpture Center
 Michael Klein (World Bank official) (born 1952), author and former World Bank official
 Michael Klein (footballer, born 1959) (1959–93), Romanian football player, played in Romania and at Bayer Uerdingen
 , German football player with Eintracht Frankfurt
 Michael R. Klein, American securities lawyer and co-founder of the Sunlight Foundation as well of chair of Sunlight's board

See also
Michael Clyne (1939–2010), Australian linguist, academic and intellectual
Michael Klien (born 1973), Austrian choreographer and artist in Ireland
Michel Klyne (1781–1868), Canadian employee of North West Company and Hudson's Bay Company